Margarita with a Straw is a 2014 Indian drama film directed by Shonali Bose. The film had its world premiere at 2014 Toronto International Film Festival, where it won the NETPAC Award or International Asian Film Premiere. The production won the Audience Award and the Youth Jury Award at the 2014 Tallinn Black Nights Film Festival, and the 2015 Vesoul International Film Festival of Asian Cinema respectively. Mikey McCleary won the Best Composer Award at the 9th Asian Film Awards. Koechlin won several accolades for the film, including the Best Actress Award at the Tallinn Black Nights Film Festival, the Screen Award for Best Actress, and the Jury Award at the 63rd National Film Awards. Additionally, she had garnered nominations for Best Actress at the Seattle International Film Festival and the Asian Film Awards.

Accolades

See also
 List of Bollywood films of 2014

Footnotes

References

External links
 Accolades for Margarita with a Straw at the Internet Movie Database

Lists of accolades by Indian film